Tales of the Quintana Roo is a collection of fantasy stories by American author Alice Sheldon, writing as James Tiptree Jr. It was released in 1986 and was the author's first book published by Arkham House. It was published in an edition of 3,673 copies. The stories originally appeared in Isaac Asimov's Science Fiction Magazine and The Magazine of Fantasy & Science Fiction and are set in the easternmost shore of the Yucatán Peninsula in Mexico. In addition to winning the world fantasy award for best collection in 1987, each of the stories was nominated or won genre awards, and "What Came Ashore at Lirios" was included in the Oxford Book of Fantasy Stories.

Contents
Tales of the Quintana Roo contains the following stories:
 "A Note About the Mayas of the Quintana Roo"
 "What Came Ashore at Lirios" (published in Isaac Asimov's Science Fiction Magazine as "Lirios: A Tale of the Quintana Roo")
 "The Boy Who Waterskied to Forever"
 "Beyond the Dead Reef"

Awards
The collection and the stories contained therein were nominated for a number of genre awards:

 Tales of Quintana Roo (Winner  of the World Fantasy Award for best collection, 1987)
 "What Came Ashore at Lirios" (Nominated for a Nebula Award, 1981)
 "The Boy Who Waterskied to Forever" (Nominated for a Hugo Award, 1982)
 "Beyond the Dead Reef" (Winner of a Locus Award for best short story, 1983)

References

Sources

External links
 
 

1986 short story collections
Fantasy short story collections
Short story collections by James Tiptree Jr.
World Fantasy Award-winning works
Arkham House books